Storm Front is the barbershop quartet that won the International Quartet Championship for 2010 at the Barbershop Harmony Society's annual international convention in Philadelphia, Pennsylvania.

The quartet has applied a comedy format from 2007 onward, with many of their songs being parodies or medleys.

Discography
 Storm Watch (CD)
 Storm Warning (CD)
 Harmony – A Beatles Tribute, Volume 1 (CD)
 Free as a Breeze (DVD)
 The Road to Gold (DVD/CD, 2010)
 Misfit Toys (CD, 2016)
 Scaramouche (CD; 2017)

References

External links
 Official website (archived)
 AIC entry

American comedy musical groups
Barbershop Harmony Society
Barbershop quartets
Professional a cappella groups